KAHM (102.1 FM, "Beautiful Music") is a radio station broadcasting the Beautiful music format. The station is licensed to Prescott, Arizona & serves the Prescott/Flagstaff/Phoenix area. It first began broadcasting on September 9, 1981.

History
KAHM went on the air on September 9, 1981, providing the Prescott area with a format of "Beautiful Music" which remains virtually unchanged..

First broadcasting under 1,000 watts, KAHM's signal expanded in the early 1990s to 58,000 watts, serving the people of northern & central Arizona, along with the metropolitan Phoenix market.

KAHM broadcasts 24 hours a day, 7 days a week and could easily be heard in southern Arizona as far south as Peoria, Scottsdale and Anthem.

Until September 14, 2015, KAHM also had an Internet stream. The stream was ended due to high demand on the server from the spike in listeners following the cancellation of the similarly formatted Sirius XM Escape channel on conventional receivers.

Effective January 12, 2018, Southwest Broadcasting sold KAHM (as well as translator K269EE and sister talk KYCA and its translator K278CN) to Phoenix Radio Broadcasting, a holding company for the Cesar Chavez Foundation's Farmworker Educational Radio Network.

Translators

References

External links
 KAHM official website
 Listen Live

Radio stations established in 1982
Prescott, Arizona
AHM
Easy listening radio stations
1982 establishments in Arizona